This article lists diplomatic missions resident in Albania.  At present, the capital city of Tirana hosts 39 embassies and a Delegation of the European Commission. Several other countries have ambassadors accredited to Albania, with most being resident in Athens or Rome.

Honorary consulates and trade missions are omitted from this listing.

Diplomatic missions in Tirana

Embassies

Other missions or delegations 
 (Embassy office) 
 (Delegation)
 (Presence/Mission)
 (Delegation)

Gallery

Consular missions

Gjirokastër 
 (Consulate General)

Korçë 
 (Consulate General)

Vlorë 
 (Consulate General)

Non-resident embassies accredited to Albania 
Resident in Ankara, Turkey:

Resident in Athens, Greece:

Resident in Rome, Italy:

Resident in Sofia, Bulgaria:

Resident in other cities:

Closed missions

See also 
 Foreign relations of Albania
 List of diplomatic missions of Albania
 Visa requirements for Albanian citizens

Notes

References

External links 
 Tirana Diplomatic List

 
Albania
Missions